Zubkov (from зуб meaning tooth) is a Russian masculine surname, its feminine counterpart is Zubkova. It may refer to

Alexandr Zubkov (born 1974), Russian bobsledder
Anatoly Zubkov (1900–1967), Soviet physiologist 
Andrey Zubkov (born 1991), Russian basketball player 
Antonina Zubkova (1920–1950), Soviet World War II pilot and Hero of the Soviet Union
Anna Zubkova (born 1980), Kazakhstani water polo player 
Illya Zubkov (born 1998), Ukrainian football player 
Kateryna Zubkova (born 1988), Ukrainian swimmer
Mikhail Zubkov (born 1968), Russian swimmer
Oleksandr Zubkov (born 1996), Ukrainian football player 
Ruslan Zubkov (born 1991), Ukrainian football player 
Valentin Zubkov (1923–1979), Soviet film actor
Viktor Zubkov (born 1941), Russian politician and businessman
Viktor Zubkov (basketball) (1937–2016), Russian basketball player
Vladimir Zubkov (born 1958), Russian ice hockey player 
Vladimir Zubkov (wrestler) (born 1948), Belarusian wrestler
Vladyslav Zubkov (born 1971), Ukrainian football player

See also
Zubov

Russian-language surnames